Shoreham Airshow took place annually in the late summer at Brighton City Airport (commonly known as Shoreham Airport), on the south coast of England. It was organised by volunteers from the local branch of the Royal Air Forces Association (RAFA), and held in aid of the RAFA Wings Appeal.

The airshow began in 1989. It had flying and static displays by a variety of aircraft such as fast jets, military helicopters, aerobatic aircraft and historic aircraft. There were ground displays by organisations such as local flying clubs and the armed forces, and of classic cars and vehicles. The show raised more than £2 million for the RAFA over 25 years.

Following the 2015 Shoreham Airshow crash, it was announced in January 2016 that the 2016 event was cancelled, and it has not been held since.

Incidents 

  The next year's show featured a special tribute to Brown.

References

External links 
 
 

Shoreham-by-Sea
Airshows in the United Kingdom